Abortion in Armenia is legal on request up to 12 weeks of pregnancy, and in special circumstances between 12 weeks and 22 weeks. Abortion has been legal since November 23, 1955, when Armenia was a republic of the Soviet Union. Pregnancies may be ended on request by the pregnant woman until the twelfth week and for medical and social reasons until the twenty-second week with a doctor's approval. Since 2016, when a law banning sex-selective abortion was passed, mandatory counseling is required before abortion along with a three-day waiting period. The law has been criticized as using sex-selective abortion as a pretext to restrict access to abortion, although the government denied this, and claimed that it did not intend to question women's right to access safe abortion.

Abortion was used as a manner of birth control in Armenia and the number of maternal deaths from abortion complications used to be very high (between 10 and 20% in 2000). After massive reforms, the number of deaths declined to 5% in 2005.

In 2014, 21.77% of pregnancies in Armenia ended in abortion, a slight rise from the all-time low recorded in 2010 (21.52%). The United Nations reported an abortion rate (expressed as the number of abortions per 1000 women aged 15–44) of 13.9 in 2004 and 16.9 .

Sex-selective abortion
Armenia, together with other countries, notably China and India, has a problem with sex-selective abortion. This has caused major political debates, both internationally and nationally. Nevertheless, the policies that Armenia has adopted to deal with this issue have been controversial and subject to criticism.

In 2016, the country adopted regulations to curb this practice. Sex-selective abortion was explicitly outlawed in 2016. However, even before 2016, sex-selective abortion was implicitly banned, as ever since Armenia's legalization of abortion in 1955 under Soviet law, it has always restricted abortion after the first trimester, when sex-selective abortions happen. The only thing that has changed several times throughout the years is the reasons laid down by the government in order for an abortion after 12 weeks to be approved. Since sex-selection was never an approved legal reason, such abortions were always technically illegal. As such, the 2016 law explicitly banning an abortion for reasons of sex-selection was seen as redundant and unenforceable, and it came with a major controversy: the requirement of a three-day waiting period. There has been concern that poor women from rural areas will not be able to afford to travel several times to cities to have safe abortions, thus increasing the rate of unsafe abortion in the country, especially given the high rate of abortion in general. A criticism of Armenia's policies that deal with sex-selection is that they do not focus on the culture which sees women as inferior, and which fuels sex-selection due to the way girls are devalued.

See also
Health in Armenia
Women in Armenia

References

Armenia
Armenia
Armenia
Women's rights in Armenia
Healthcare in Armenia